The 9th edition of Mr Gay World took place from May 5–10, 2017 in Madrid and Maspalomas, Spain. 21 contestants from all over the world will compete for the title and become an ambassador for the LGBT community. The reigning titleholder Mr. Gay World 2016 Roger Gosalbez  from Spain crowned his successor John Raspado from Philippines, at the end of the event.

Results

Contestants
21 contestants competed for the title:

References

2017 in LGBT history
LGBT beauty pageants
Male beauty pageants
May 2017 events in Spain
2017